Latifur Rahman (28 August 1945 –  1 July 2020) was a Bangladeshi business magnate and media mogul. He served as the founding chairman and CEO of Transcom Group which deals with beverages, electrical and electronics products, pharmaceuticals, fast food, snacks and breakfast cereals, print media, FM radio and tea plantations mostly as the comprador of international brands like Pizza Hut, KFC, Pepsi and Philips. He was the founding director of Mediaworld and Chairman of Mediastar, which owned The Daily Star and Prothom Alo newspapers respectively. Both are the nation's leading English and Bangla newspapers.

Rahman received the Oslo Business for Peace Award 2012 in 2012 for his recognition of business ethics and social responsibility.

Career
Rahman started his career as a trainee in 1966 in his family-owned jute mills in Chandpur District. He worked as an executive in the mills until 1971. Rahman established Transcom Group in 1973 after W Rahman Jute Mills, the main earning source for the Rahman family, was nationalised in 1972. In the 1980s, Rahman became the sole importer and distributor of Nestlé products in Bangladesh. In the 1990s, he bought Smith, Kline & French, a US-based pharmaceutical which had merged into Beecham Group, a British company, and renamed it Eskayef.

Rahman was elected a member of the executive board of the Paris-based International Chamber of Commerce for a three-year term in July 2014. He served as the president of Metropolitan Chamber of Commerce and Industry (MCCI), Dhaka.

Rahman served as the Chairman of the following companies.

Awards
 Oslo Business for Peace Award by Business for Peace Foundation (2012)
 Business Executive of the Year by American Chamber of Commerce Bangladesh (2001)
 A crest by the Vice-Chancellor of the University of Dhaka (2012)

Personal life
Rahman was married to Shahnaz Rahman. Together they had three daughters, Simeen Hossain, Shazneen Rahman, and Shahzreh Huq, and a son, Arshad Waliur Rahman. Simeen is a managing director of Eskayef Bangladesh Limited, Transcom Consumer Products Limited and Transcom Distribution Limited. Shazneen was killed at home in Gulshan, Dhaka in 1998 by their household domestic helpers. Simeen's younger son, Faraaz Ayaaz Hossain, was killed in the 2016 Gulshan attack.

Rahman died on 1 July 2020 at his residence at Chheora village in Chauddagram Upazila, Cumilla aged 75. He was buried at Banani Graveyard in Dhaka.

References

1945 births
2020 deaths
People from Jalpaiguri
People from Comilla District
Bangladeshi businesspeople
Bangladeshi_newspaper_proprietors
Bangladeshi chairpersons of corporations
Burials at Banani Graveyard
Bangladeshi chief executives